Terry Springthorpe (December 4, 1923 in Draycott, Derbyshire, England – July 25, 2006) was an English-American football defender. He began his career in England before moving to the American Soccer League in 1950. He also earned two caps with the U.S. national team.

Career

Club
Springthorpe originally signed with Wolverhampton Wanderers in 1939. However World World II started later that year and brought an end to the Football League. The government imposed a 50-mile travelling limit on all football teams and the Football League divided all the clubs into seven regional areas. Wolves joined the Midland League and won the 1939-40 championship. Springthorpe played in 9 games that season.

Springthorpe was resigned to Wolves on August 1, 1947 and played with the team until he transferred to Coventry City on December 1, 1950. During his three years with Wolves, he saw time in thirty-five league games and one FA Cup game. However, that one cup game was significant as Wolves defeated Leicester City 3–1 in the 1949 Cup final.

In December 1950, he moved to Coventry City for £10,000. He then played twelve league games with Coventry before leaving the team on May 31, 1951 to move to the United States.

In 1953, Springthorpe was with the New York Americans of the American Soccer League (ASL). In 1957, Americans merged with Brooklyn Hakoah to form the New York Hakoah-Americans. Springthorpe remained with the renamed team through at least 1958.

National team
Springthorpe earned two caps with the U.S. national team. The first was a 6–3 loss to England on June 8, 1953. This game was notable as the first soccer game played under lights in the United States. His second national team game did not come until April 28, 1957. In that game, the U.S. fell to Mexico in a World Cup qualifier.

References

 

1923 births
2006 deaths
English footballers
Wolverhampton Wanderers F.C. players
Coventry City F.C. players
British emigrants to the United States
United States men's international soccer players
American Soccer League (1933–1983) players
New York Americans (soccer) (1933–1956) players
New York Hakoah-Americans players
American soccer players
Association football defenders
English expatriate sportspeople in the United States
Expatriate soccer players in the United States
English expatriate footballers
FA Cup Final players